The 1993 Copa CONMEBOL Finals were the two-legged series that decided the winner of 1993 Copa CONMEBOL, the 2nd. edition of this international competition. The finals were contested by Brazilian club Botafogo and Uruguayan club Peñarol.

The first leg was held in Estadio Centenario in Montevideo, where both teams tied 1–1, while the second leg was held in Maracanã Stadium, in Rio de Janeiro with another tie (2–2) registered. As both teams were tied on points and goal difference, a Penalty shoot-out was carried out to decide the series. Botafogo won on penalties 3–1 to claim their first title in the competition.

Qualified teams

Venues

Route to the final

Note: In all results below, the score of the finalist is given first.

Match details

First leg

Second leg

References 

Copa CONMEBOL Finals
c
c
1993 in South American football
1993 in Uruguayan football
1993 in Brazilian football